Aerograph may refer to:

Aerograph, a manufacturer and brand name of airbrush 
Aerograph, a 1919 piece of artwork by Man Ray